Codename: Kids Next Door is a 78-episode American animated television series created by Mr. Warburton and produced by Curious Pictures. The series debuted on Cartoon Network in the United States on December 6, 2002, and ended  on January 21, 2008, with the special episode, "Operation: I.N.T.E.R.V.I.E.W.S.". Warburton originally pitched "Diseasy Does It", his Hanna-Barbera-produced short for a series titled Kenny and the Chimp, with "Those Kids Next Door" planned as recurring characters. When the plot was refined to have the "Kids Next Door" as main characters, Warburton created "No P in the OOL", a series pilot produced by Cartoon Network Studios. The pilot was broadcast in 2001 as part of the network's The Big Pick II event, a marathon of similar pilot shorts resulting in a viewer poll to determine which series should be greenlit for a full series, and "No P in the OOL" won that poll. The series follows the adventures of a diverse group of five 10-year-old children who operate from a high-tech treehouse, fighting against adult and teen villains with advanced 2×4 technology. Using their code names (Numbuhs 1, 2, 3, 4, and 5), they are Sector V, part of a global organization called the Kids Next Door.

Each season consists of 13 episodes, most of which are composed of two 11-minute stories, making about 26 segments per season. There are also several full-length 22-minute episodes. Each title is in the form of an acronym that gives the viewer clues as to what the plot is. Spin-off media include comic books, trading cards, toys, and two compilation DVDs released in 2004 and 2005, titled Sooper Hugest Missions: File One and File Two.

Series overview

Episodes

Pilots (1998–2001)

Season 1 (2002–03)

Season 2 (2003–04)

Season 3 (2004)

Season 4 (2004–05)

Season 5 (2005–06)

Season 6 (2006–07)

Specials

Television film (2006)

Crossover special (2007)

Series finale (2008)

References

External links
 

Lists of American children's animated television series episodes
Lists of Cartoon Network television series episodes